Fu Yiting (born 27 January 1996) is a Chinese fencer. She competed in the women's individual foil event at the 2018 Asian Games, winning the silver medal.

References

1996 births
Living people
Sportspeople from Beijing
Chinese female foil fencers
Asian Games silver medalists for China
Fencers at the 2018 Asian Games
Asian Games medalists in fencing
Medalists at the 2018 Asian Games
21st-century Chinese women